The 4th constituency of Moselle is a French legislative constituency in the Moselle département.

Description

Moselle's 4th constituency covers the areas in the south east of the department, it is the largest in terms of area in Moselle. It is bordered to the south by Meurthe-et-Moselle and to the east by Haut-Rhin.

The constituency has normally been held by conservative parties throughout the Fifth Republic with the exception of the fourteen years between 1988 and 2002 when it has held by Aloyse Warhouver.

The constituency is also notable for being the home seat of former Prime Minister Pierre Messmer.

Historic Representation

Election results

2022 

 
 
|-
| colspan="8" bgcolor="#E9E9E9"|
|-

2017

2012

 
 
 
 
|-
| colspan="8" bgcolor="#E9E9E9"|
|-

Sources
Official results of French elections from 2002: "Résultats électoraux officiels en France" (in French).

4